Balea is a genus of small, very elongate, air-breathing land snails, sinistral terrestrial pulmonate gastropod mollusks in the family Clausiliidae, the door snails.

Balea is the type genus of the subfamily Baleinae.

Species
Species within this genus include:
 Balea biplicata (Montague, 1803) – synonym: Alinda biplicata
 Balea fallax (Rossmässler, 1836)
 Balea jugularis (Vest, 1859)
 Balea kaeufeli (Brandt, 1962)
 Balea nitida Mousson, 1858
 Balea nordsiecki Dedov & Neubert, 2002
 Balea pancici Pavlović, 1912
 Balea perversa (Linnaeus, 1758) – the type species of the genus
 Balea sarsii Pfeiffer, 1847 - synonym: Balea heydeni von Maltzan, 1881
 Balea serbica (Möllendorff, 1873)
 Balea stabilis (Pfeiffer, 1847)
 Balea viridana (Rossmässler, 1836)
 Balea vratzatica (Likharev, 1972)
 Balea wagneri (Wagner, 1911)

References

External links
 Gittenberger E., Groenenberg D. S. J., Kokshoorn B. & Preece R. C. (2006). "Molecular trails from hitch-hiking snails". Nature 439: 409. . PDF supplements.

Clausiliidae
Gastropod genera
Taxa named by John Edward Gray